Passmores Academy is a 11–18 secondary school in Harlow, Essex.

The academy has an annual intake of 240 pupils in Year 7, and in the (January 2013) is approximately 1,000 pupils. It featured in the 2011 television series Educating Essex.

The current co-principals are Vic Goddard and Nat Christie.

History
The school was originally Passmores Comprehensive School, later becoming Passmores School and Technology College, until its conversion to Academy status in September 2011 when the name was changed to Passmores Academy.

The school reopened for the 2011–12 school year on a new site which is approximately one mile from its old site. This new site is the home of a £25 million new building which was constructed over a two-year period from 2009 on the old Brays Grove Secondary School site.

The current co-principals are Mr Vic Goddard and Ms Nat Christie. In November 2008 the school was graded as Outstanding by Ofsted, having been graded as Good in November 2005. It received a Good in May 2018.

In September 2013 Purford Green Primary School and Potter Street Primary School became part of Passmores Cooperative Learning Community as well as becoming feeder schools. In 2018 The Downs Primary School and Nursery joined.

Curriculum 
There is a two-year Key Stage 3, with French and Spanish being the only languages offered.

Educating Essex 

The school played host to a seven part Channel 4 reality TV show, Educating Essex. The show follows a group of GCSE pupils, and the staff who teach them, as they face the most important year in their education. The school was fitted with 65 fixed cameras – from the corridors to the canteen, and from the headteacher's office to the detention hall. Recording with the fixed cameras lasted for seven weeks. This was used alongside occasional standard filming by camera crews from September 2010 to August 2011 and edited down into a seven part series.

Berereavement support during the COVID-19 pandemic

In 2020, the school was aware of the need to support children and staff who had had family members die during the COVID-19 pandemic.

See also
List of schools in Essex
Technology college

References

External links
 Passmores webpage
 Winston's Wish bereavement support training for teachers

Academies in Essex
Secondary schools in Essex
Educational institutions established in 2011
2011 establishments in England